Ion Dissonance is a Canadian mathcore band from Montreal, Quebec. They are known for their technical style, which switched to a more groove based style with the release of their 2007 album Minus the Herd.

In total, the group have released five full-length albums and are well known in the Montreal music scene.

History
Antoine Lussier and Sebastien Chaput formed Ion Dissonance during the late summer of 2001 with the intention of creating a fusion of hardcore and metal that was more complex and daring than what they have done before. Jean-François Richard would join shortly after on drums. With these members, their sound started to take shape, but they still required a few more individuals to fill some parts. To that end they recruited Gabriel McCaughry (vocals) and Sebastien Painchaud (bass guitar). Upon completing their first official line-up, the band released a demo CD named .357, which was quickly put together in 2002 for promotional purposes to various zines, labels and individuals around North America. This demo is now out of print but was released on mp3.com. Soon, once obtaining The Gift, they received positive reviews and reactions. In this short time, they had to pick an appropriate label to support them and release their first LP. They decided to stay with Willowtip Records (Cacophonous Records in Europe). The line-up was changed when Sebastien Painchaud was replaced by their second bassist, Miguel Valade. With this change, they started playing their first major shows as the opening act for such bands as The Dillinger Escape Plan, Every Time I Die, Daughters, Misery Index, The End, and The Black Dahlia Murder.

During April 2003 they started the recording process for their first LP, Breathing Is Irrelevant with producer Yannick St-Amand (Neuraxis, Martyr, Despised Icon, In Dying Days), the album was completed in June 2003, and it came out in September 2003. It received many favourable reviews from a number of webzines and magazines including Metal Maniacs, Terrorizer and Unrestrained!. 

In 2004, they started their first big tour including shows along US East Coast with Forever Is Forgotten, which was successful due to the positive reaction from the crowds; shows from the East to West Coast of Canada with fellow Canadians The End; this was then followed by the Maryland Deathfest. Subsequently, bassist Miguel Valade was replaced by Xavier St-Laurent. 

After the release of their second album Solace on Abacus Recordings, Ion Dissonance once again toured Canada and the US. On Tuesday, June 20, 2006, Gabriel announced his departure from the band, citing personal issues and different interests in music. In October 2006, the band introduced their new vocalist, Kevin McCaughey, formerly of Shaolin. 

In April 2007, Ion Dissonance recorded their third album, Minus the Herd. There has been some controversy over this album dealing with the differences between the old and the new vocalist. The newer is generally considered to be heavier and missing some of the "chaos" from the older albums. After being in Western Europe for a tour with Through the Eyes of the Dead, they returned to Canada and the US for The Summer Slaughter Tour. In late August 2009, they announced that a new album is being written.

In 2010, Ion Dissonance released their fourth album Cursed. About the album, Antoine Lussier of Ion Dissonance explained the band's intentions for Cursed were to pick up where they left off on their 2005 career-defining album, Solace. "After [Minus the Herd] we wanted to stick to the sound that we started with and we want to finish with it," he says. "I think we really got a good picture of what our sound is supposed to be. I'm not saying it's the best sound ever, it's just the best picture of Ion Dissonance we've taken so far."

In December 2014, Ion Dissonance  announced that Dominic Grimard from  the band, The Last Felony will be taking over bass duties for Yannick Desgroseillers due to his health issues. However, he is still involved with the band and assisted with the recording process.  This news came along with a new demo called, "Ill Will", their first new song since releasing Cursed.

On November 18, 2016, Ion Dissonance released their fifth album Cast the First Stone on Good Fight Music.

Band members

Current
Antoine Lussier − guitar (2001−present)
Sebastien Chaput − guitar (2001−present)
Jean-François Richard − drums (2001−present)
Kevin McCaughey − vocals (2006−present)
Dominic Grimard - bass guitar (2014-present)

Former
Gabriel McCaughry − vocals (2001−2006)
Sebastien Painchaud − bass  guitar (2001−2002)
Miguel Valade − bass guitar (2002−2004)
Xavier St-Laurent − bass guitar (2004−2007)
Yannick Desgroseillers - bass guitar (2007-2014)

Timeline

Discography

Studio albums
Breathing Is Irrelevant (2003)
Solace (2005)
Minus the Herd (2007)
Cursed (2010)
Cast the First Stone (2016)

Miscellaneous
.357 (2002, demo)
Split with Despised Icon (2006, split)

References

Musical groups established in 2001
English-language musical groups from Quebec
Musical groups from Montreal
EMI Records artists
Mathcore musical groups
Canadian metalcore musical groups
Deathcore musical groups
Abacus Recordings artists